This is a list of destinations served by Astraeus Airlines until it ceased operations in November 2011.

Africa
Algeria
Hassi Messaoud - Oued Irara Airport
Cape Verde
Rabil - Rabil Airport
Sal - Amílcar Cabral International Airport
Egypt
Alexandria - Borg El Arab Airport
Hurghada - Hurghada International Airport
Sharm el-Sheikh - Sharm el-Sheikh International Airport
Taba - Taba International Airport
Equatorial Guinea
Bata - Bata Airport
Malabo - Malabo International Airport
The Gambia
Banjul - Banjul International Airport
Ghana
Accra - Kotoka International Airport
Liberia
Monrovia - Roberts International Airport

Asia
Kazakhstan
Uralsk - Oral Ak Zhol Airport

Europe
France
Chambéry - Chambéry Airport
Germany
Berlin-Schönefeld Airport
Portugal
Madeira - Funchal Airport
Spain
Palma - Palma de Mallorca Airport
United Kingdom
London - London Gatwick Airport (hub)
Newcastle upon Tyne - Newcastle Airport

References

Lists of airline destinations